Champ (brúitín in Irish) is an Irish dish of mashed potatoes with scallions, butter, and milk.

Description 
Champ is made by combining mashed potatoes and chopped scallions with butter, milk and optionally, salt and pepper. It was sometimes made with stinging nettle rather than scallions. In some areas the dish is also called "poundies".

Champ is similar to another Irish dish, colcannon, which uses kale or cabbage in place of scallions. Champ is popular in Ulster whilst colcannon is more so in the other three provinces of Ireland. It was customary to make champ with the first new potatoes harvested.

The word champ has also been adopted into the popular Hiberno-English phrases, to be "as thick as champ", meaning to be ill-tempered or sullen, or stupid.

Samhain 
The dish is associated with Samhain, and would be served on that night. In many parts of Ireland, it was tradition to offer a portion of champ to the fairies by placing a dish of champ with a spoon at the foot of a hawthorn.

Similar dishes

See also
 List of Irish dishes
 List of onion dishes
 List of potato dishes
 Irish cuisine
 Northern Irish cuisine

References

Cuisine of Northern Ireland
Irish cuisine
Potato dishes
Scallion dishes